is a Japanese sound, installation and interactive artist. He is a professor at Keio University.

References

External links 
 Ars Electronica Archive

1956 births
Living people